Ángel Tulio Zof (July 8, 1928 – November 26, 2014) was an Argentine footballer and coach.

Career
He played for Rosario Central, Huracán, Atlanta and Quilmes as a left winger. Internationally, he played for, among other teams, Toronto F.C. (Canada) and Hakoah (New York). Later, he became the coach of Ledesma de Jujuy, Club Atlético Platense, Atlanta, San Martín (T), Newell's Old Boys, Rosario Central, Los Andes. 

As manager of Rosario Central he came second in the Argentine championship in 1970, won the "Nacional" championship in 1980, the  1986/87 championship, and the Copa Conmebol in 1995. He only won the championship in his hometown team of Rosario Central where he managed 525 matches, won 200, drew 186 and lost 137. In December 2006 he logged his 900th game as manager.

Death
Zof died in Buenos Aires, Argentina, aged 86.

References

External links
 Once-once.narod.ru

1928 births
2014 deaths
Footballers from Rosario, Santa Fe
Argentine footballers
Rosario Central footballers
Club Atlético Huracán footballers
Club Atlético Atlanta footballers
Quilmes Atlético Club footballers
Atlético Morelia players
Association football midfielders
Argentine football managers
Club Atlético Platense managers
Rosario Central managers
Newell's Old Boys managers
San Martín de Tucumán managers